Samuel Simbo (born 10 February 1960) is a Sierra Leonean boxer. He competed in the men's middleweight event at the 1988 Summer Olympics.

References

1960 births
Living people
Sierra Leonean male boxers
Olympic boxers of Sierra Leone
Boxers at the 1988 Summer Olympics
Place of birth missing (living people)
Middleweight boxers